The Chablais Alps are a mountain range in the western Alps. They are situated between Lake Geneva and the Mont Blanc Massif. The Col des Montets separates them from the Mont Blanc Massif in the south, and the Rhône valley separates them from the Bernese Alps in the east.

The Chablais Alps are composed of two distinct parts separated by the Val d'Illiez: the Dents du Midi massif on the south which contains the highest peaks, and the alpine foothills on the north.

Peaks 

The peaks of the Chablais Alps include:

See also 
Swiss Alps
French Alps

References 

Mountain ranges of the Alps
Mountain ranges of Switzerland
Mountain ranges of Auvergne-Rhône-Alpes
Mountains of Valais
Swiss Alps